
Year 359 (CCCLIX) was a common year starting on Friday (link will display the full calendar) of the Julian calendar. At the time, it was known as the Year of the Consulship of Eusebius and Hypatius (or, less frequently, year 1112 Ab urbe condita). The denomination 359 for this year has been used since the early medieval period, when the Anno Domini calendar era became the prevalent method in Europe for naming years.

Events 
 By place 
 Roman Empire 
 King Shapur II the Great of the Persian Empire invades southern Armenia. The Romans implement a scorched earth policy and place strong guards at the Euphrates crossings. 
 Siege of Amida: Shapur II besieges the Roman fortress of Amida (modern Diyarbakir). After seventy-three days the city is conquered and the population is massacred by the Persians. Ammianus Marcellinus is a fortunate survivor and flees to Singara (Iraq).
 The first known Prefect of the city of Constantinople, Honoratus, takes office.
 Famine in Upper Rhineland: A fleet of 800 river boats, built for the Rhine, cross to the British east coast, and carry back enough corn to raise the famine.
 Winter – Shapur II halts his campaign, due to heavy casualties during the Persian invasion.

 By topic 
 Art 
 The Sarcophagus of Junius Bassus, in the Old St. Peter's Basilica, Vatican, is made (approximate date).

 Religion 
 July – Emperor Constantius II convenes the Council of Rimini, to resolve the crisis over Arianism in the Church. Some 400 bishops of the Western Roman Empire attend, while the Eastern bishops simultaneously hold a meeting at Seleucia. Given Saint Jerome's comment that, "The whole world groaned in astonishment to find itself Arian", it appears to have failed. Pope Liberius rejects the new creed at Rimini.

Births 
 Godigisel, king of the Vandals (d. 406)
 Gratian, Roman emperor (d. 383)
 Murong Chong, Chinese emperor (d. 386)
 Stilicho, Roman general (d. 408)

Deaths 
 Barbatio, Roman general (magister militum)
 Hosius of Corduba, Christian bishop (b. 256)
 Junius Bassus Theotecnius, Roman politician
 Xun Xian (or Lingze), Chinese general (b. 322)
 Zhang Guan, Chinese general and regent

References